Lutfozzaman Babar is a Bangladeshi politician who served as the Bangladeshi State Minister of Home Affairs in the Khaleda Zia Cabinet, as a member of the Bangladesh Nationalist Party. He is currently in prison for the death penalties in two cases – in January 2014 on charges of 2004 arms smuggling in Chittagong and in October 2018 for killing through criminal conspiracy at the 2004 Dhaka grenade attack.

Early life and career
Babar is originated from Netrokona. He joined the central committee of Bangladesh Nationalist Party in 1996.

Babar was elected to parliament twice from Netrokona-4 constituency during 1991–1996 and 2001–2006. In 2001, he was appointed as the State Minister of Home Affairs as the youngest member of the Khaleda Zia Cabinet.

After the 2005 Netrokona bombing, Babar first blamed the attack on a Hindu man, Yadav Das, who was killed in the explosion but on 15 December 2005, he rescinded his statement and said Yadav was innocent.

On 27 December 2008, Babar was expelled from BNP after contesting the 2008 Bangladeshi general election as an independent candidate while in prison. In December 2009, BNP withdrew the expulsion order against him and reinstated him in the party.

Charges and convictions

Illegal firearms and ammunitions
During the 2007 state of emergency in Bangladesh, Babar was arrested from his Gulshan residence on 28 May for possessing illegal firearms. On 30 October, he was sentenced to 10 years in prison for keeping a revolver illegally and another 7 years for keeping 25 rounds of bullets illegally. He was found guilty by a special tribunal set up by the caretaker government. On 1 December 2008, he lost his division status in the prison after he had been caught twice in possession of contraband cellphones.

Grenade attack
The 2004 Dhaka grenade attack on 21 August on an Awami League rally killed Ivy Rahman, wife of future President Zillur Rahman, along with 23 others and wounded more than 300 people. According to the April 2011 confessional statements by the Harkat-ul-Jihad-al-Islami (HUJI) leader Mufti Abdul Hannan, upon his request, Tarique Rahman, then senior joint secretary general of BNP, assigned Babar, then state home minister, and Abdus Salam Pintu, then deputy industries minister, to provide assistance to the HUJI men to carry out the attack. Hannan met Babar among others in a meeting in Hawa Bhaban, the political office of BNP Chairperson Khaleda Zia. On 18 August 2004, three days before the attack, the HUJI leaders met Babar at the residence of Pintu. In March 2012, a Dhaka court framed charges against 30 accused, including Babar, in the supplementary charge sheet of the case. According to the charges, Babar and Pintu assured all administrative assistance regarding the attack. Also Maulana Tajuddin, supplier of the grenades, also a brother of Pintu, left Bangladesh for Pakistan on instructions from Babar. On 10 October 2018, Babar was given death penalty on charges of killing through criminal conspiracy. He had appealed the verdict.

Chittagong arms haul
On 1 April 2004, Bangladesh Police and Bangladesh Coast Guard interrupted a loading of 10 trucks and seized illegal arms and ammunitions at a jetty of Chittagong Urea Fertilizer Limited (CUFL) on the Karnaphuli River. Babar, the then state home minister, visited the area the next day to inspect the seized arms.

After the 2008 Bangladeshi general election, when Awami League formed the government, fresh investigation started on this case. On 30 September 2010, in a statement to a Chittagong court, Sabbir Ali, the then police-commissioner of Chittagong metropolitan police, said that Babar directed him not to arrest National Security Intelligence officials engaged to help offload arms and ammunition at the jetty on 2 April 2004. on 3 October, Babar was arrested for direct involvement in that arms haul. On 15 March 2012, former Directorate General of Forces Intelligence chief Sadik Hasan Rumi told Chittagong Metropolitan Special Tribunal-1 that Babar might have links to the smuggling of the arms since Babar forbade him not to conduct an independent investigation into the incident following the seizure.

On 30 January 2014, Babar was sentenced to death for his role in the case.

Others
Babar was sued by the Anti-Corruption Commission for hiding information about wealth worth about Tk 7.6 crore in the wealth statement. On 16 September 2008, he was granted bail on the case.

Babar was among the 32 people charged with the killing of former finance minister Shah A M S Kibria in January 2005.

References

Living people
People from Netrokona District
Bangladesh Nationalist Party politicians
5th Jatiya Sangsad members
8th Jatiya Sangsad members
State Ministers of Home Affairs (Bangladesh)
Bangladeshi politicians convicted of crimes
Year of birth missing (living people)
Bangladeshi male criminals
Prisoners and detainees of Bangladesh